The  is the 19th edition of the Japan Film Professional Awards. It awarded the best of 2009 in film. The ceremony took place on May 15, 2010 at Shin-Bungeiza in Tokyo. The five films released 2000 to 2009 were also elected as Zero-age Best 5 films.

Awards 
Best Film: Watashi wa Neko Stalker
Best Director: Mamoru Hosoda (Summer Wars)
Best Actress: Bae Doona (Air Doll)
Best Actor: Shun Sugata (Pochi no Kokuhaku)
Best New Director: Takuji Suzuki (Watashi wa Neko Stalker)
Best New Encouragement: Hikari Mitsushima (Pride)
Best New Encouragement: Marī Machida (Miyoko Asagaya Kibun)

10 best films
 Watashi wa Neko Stalker (Takuji Suzuki)
 Summer Wars (Mamoru Hosoda)
 Air Doll (Hirokazu Koreeda)
 Ōsaka Hamlet (Fujirō Mitsuishi)
 Annyeong Yumika (etsuaki Matsue)
 April Bride (Ryūichi Hiroki)
 Occult (Kōji Shiraishi)
 Shōnen Merikensakku (Kankurō Kudō)
 Pride (Shusuke Kaneko)

Zero-age 5 best films
 Eureka (Shinji Aoyama)
 United Red Army (Kōji Wakamatsu)
 Bright Future (Kiyoshi Kurosawa)
 Akame 48 Waterfalls (Genjiro Arato)
 Ichi the Killer (Takashi Miike)

References

External links
  

Japan Film Professional Awards
2010 in Japanese cinema
Japan Film Professional Awards
May 2010 events in Japan